The 2019–20 Bobsleigh World Cup was a multi-race series over a season for bobsleigh. The season started on 7 December 2019 in Lake Placid, USA and finished on 16 February 2020 in Sigulda, Latvia.

Calendar 
Below is the schedule of the 2019/20 season.

Results

Two-man

Four-man

Two-woman

Standings

Two-man

Four-man

Two-woman

Medal table

References 

Bobsleigh World Cup
2019 in bobsleigh
2020 in bobsleigh